James Timothy Gleeson  (21 November 1915 – 20 October 2008) was an Australian artist. He served on the board of the National Gallery of Australia.

Early life
Gleeson was born in the Sydney district of Hornsby in 1915 and attended East Sydney Technical College from 1934 to 1936.

In 1938 Gleeson studied at Sydney Teachers College, where he gained two years training in general primary school teaching. Salvador Dalí, Max Ernst, André Masson, Sigmund Freud and Carl Jung became major influence in Gleeson's work.

Work
Gleeson's themes generally delved into the subconscious using literary, mythological or religious subject matter. He was particularly interested in Jung's archetypes of the collective unconscious.  In 1944 Gleeson created The sower referencing Jean-François Millet's 1850 painting of the same title. Rather than showing a landscape with a conglomerate main figure, Gleeson presents an eerie twentieth-century view of a desolated one. He commented on the work's genesis as a response to the trauma of longtime warfare:During the 1950s and '60s he moved to a more symbolic perspective, notions of human perfectibility. At this time he increasingly fashioned small psychedelic compositions made using the surrealist technique of decalcomania in the background, to suggest a landscape, and finished by adding a fastidiously painted male nude in the foreground. Many of his paintings had homoerotic undertones, something which reflected on Gleeson's own homosexuality. The ideas for these compositions also saw Gleeson move into collage with his Locus Solus series, where he produced a substantial body of work by placing dismembered photographs, magazine illustrations, diagrams and lines of visionary poetry against abstract pools of ink.

Since the 1970s Gleeson generally made large scale paintings in keeping with the surrealist inscape genre. The works outwardly resemble rocky seascapes, although in detail the coastline's geological features are found to be made of giant molluscs and threatening crustaceans. In keeping with the Freudian principles of surrealism these grotesque, nightmarish compositions symbolise the inner workings of the human mind. Called 'Psychoscapes' by the artist, they show liquid, solid and air coming together and directly allude to the interface between the conscious, subconscious and unconscious mind. 
Gleeson's later works incorporate the human form less and less in its entirety. The human form was then represented in his landscapes by suggestions, an arm, a hand or merely an eye.

In the late 1970s, Gleeson interviewed 98 Australian artists in their studios, about their work being acquired by the National Gallery. The informal conversations explore how works were made and then acquired. Gleeson was a visiting curator of Australian art at the time of the interviews, and then chairman of the Gallery's Acquisitions Committee from 1974 to 1975. The interviews were commissioned by the Gallery's director, James Mollison, in order to collect more information for the Gallery's Research Library collection. The original tapes, transcripts, photographs and digitised recordings are held by the Gallery's Library.

In 2008, the James Gleeson Oral History Collection's significance was recognised by it being inscribed into the UNESCO Australian Memory of the World Register. The inscription was announced at the program's conference, Communities and Memories: A Global Perspective in Canberra.

His retrospective in 2004–2005, Beyond the Screen of Sight, included 120 paintings and was exhibited in Melbourne and Canberra. The Art Gallery of New South Wales exhibited Gleeson's drawings for paintings in 2003 and The Ubu diptych in 2005 to celebrate Gleeson's 90th birthday. The Ubu diptych is regarded as one of his greatest.

In September 2007, the largest collection of Australian surrealism ever collected was donated to the National Gallery of Australia by Ray Wilson. The collection included various works by James Gleeson.

Death 
Gleeson died in Sydney on 20 October 2008, aged 92. His life partner Frank O'Keefe died in 2007.

See also
Australian art

References

External links
Grandi Artisi - James Gleeson - collection of his paintings
Eva Breuer Art Dealer - more of his paintings
James Gleeson artworks (for sale) on art.net.au
James Gleeson at the Art Gallery of New South Wales
James Timothy Gleeson at Australian Art
James Gleeson passes away, 20 October 2008, The Daily Telegraph, Sydney, Australia
James Gleeson: Surrealist painter, art critic and curator who drew dark inspiration from contemporary events (Obituary), Kathy Marks,  The Independent, 29 October 2008

1915 births
2008 deaths
Australian art critics
Australian gay artists
Artists from Sydney
National Art School alumni
Australian LGBT poets
20th-century Australian painters
20th-century Australian male artists
20th-century Australian poets
Australian male poets
20th-century Australian male writers
Members of the Order of Australia
Officers of the Order of Australia
Australian male painters
20th-century Australian LGBT people
Australian gay writers